Brahui may refer to:
Brahui language, a Dravidian language native to the Balochistan Province of Pakistan
Brahui people, an ethnic group native to the Balochistan region of Pakistan
Abdul Karim Brahui (born 1955), politician of Afghanistan

Language and nationality disambiguation pages